Kapaz PFK, is an Azerbaijani football club based in Ganja, which competes in the Azerbaijan Premier League, the highest tier of Azerbaijan football. The club was founded as Toxucu in 1959. They have won the Azerbaijani Championship 3 times and the Azerbaijani Football Cup 4 times.

The team's colours are yellow and blue. The club plays at Ganja City Stadium which has a capacity of 26,120.

History

Soviet era (1959–1991)
Kapaz PFC was founded in 1959 as Toxucu and played in the Soviet First League. However, the team were promoted to the Soviet Top League in 1968 as Dinamo Kirovobad after finishing first in the Soviet First League the previous season. The club has been known as Taraggi and Toxucu during its history, however it became famous in more modern times as Kapaz when it was renamed in 1982.

Post-Soviet era (1993–1999)
In 1991, the club was once again renamed as Kapaz after Azerbaijan's independence from the Soviet Union and won the Azerbaijan Premier League title three times. At the end of the 1997-98 season, Kapaz finished the season unbeaten. Out of 28 games, the club's final record for the 1997–1998 league campaign stood at 22 wins, 4 draws and 0 losses. To date this has not been matched by any team in a single season in an Azerbaijani league division.

Azerbaijan's longest league winning run belongs to Kapaz PFC.

Kapaz PFC remain the only team to win the league undefeated and, for ten months until 23 September 1998, opponents could not even take a point off them. Two of the 22 matches were technical victories awarded to Käpäz.

Financial struggles (2002–present)
Kapaz, one of the most prominent football clubs in Azerbaijan, entered financial difficulties during the late 2000s. Since 2002, the club has found themselves slipping further and further down the table, which has been influenced by financial difficulties. The financial collapse of Kapaz resulted in a great deal of discussion within Azerbaijani football. Major Azerbaijani companies, reportedly "concerned at the current uncertainty about the club's future and its backers" declined to provide Kapaz with the corporate banking facilities it needed.

In 2005, the club's new owners decided to rename the club Ganja despite facing criticism from the club's fans. In 2007, the club was excluded from Azerbaijan Premier League due to financial struggles. However, after help from the AFFA and local communities, the club participated in the Azerbaijan First Division during the 2009-10 season. In 2010 they became champions of the Azerbaijan First Division finishing the season with 47 points and promoted to the Azerbaijan Premier League. In 2011, it was decided that the club's name will be changed back to its old name of Kapaz PFC.

In April 2013, Kapaz were relegated to the Azerbaijan First Division. The ended the season in 12th place in the Azerbaijan Premier League, the club's lowest ever league finish. The club's financial situation didn't improve, which caused a lot of players to leave the club.

On 18 November 2017, Shahin Diniyev resigned as manager with Yunis Hüseynov being appointed as his replacement 2 days later on 20 November 2017.

For the 2022/23 Azerbaijani Premier League season, an expansion of the league to 10 teams was implemented. As there are only five independent football clubs in the first division, and FK Zaqatala, Qaradag Lokbatan and MOIK Baku declined to play in the Premier league for financial reasons, Kapaz and Turan Tovuz were promoted for next season.

League and cup history

European history

Supporters

The club have one of the biggest number of supporters in Azerbaijan alongside Neftçi, Khazar Lankaran and Qarabağ. Amongst all Azerbaijani professional football clubs, Kapaz PFC have the highest average fan attendance at their home games. According to official statistics for the first half of 2015-16 season, Kapaz PFC ranked first in fan attendance at nearly 15,000 fans per home game. This was almost triple that of their nearest rival.

The 2015-16 seasons attendance record was set in Ganja, as 20,400 Kapaz fans attended home game against Qarabag FC on February 14, 2016 The fanbase is large and generally loyal and like most major Azerbaijani football clubs, Kapaz have a number of domestic supporters' clubs, including the Khamsa Supporters Club, which works closely with the club and maintains a more independent line. The club's most popular celebrity supporters are the likes of Olympic wrestling champion Toghrul Asgarov.

Shirt sponsors and kit manufacturers

Honours

Azerbaijan
Azerbaijan League
Champions (3): 1994–95, 1997–98, 1998–99
Runners–up (1): 1999–00

Azerbaijan Cup
 Winners (4): 1993–94, 1996–97, 1997–98, 1999–00

Azerbaijan First Division
Champions (1): 2009–10

USSR
Soviet First League (Class A, 2nd Group)
Champions (1): 1967

Soviet Second League
Champions (1): 1965
Runners–up (1): 1986

Soviet Cup
Quarter-finalist (1): 1962

Players
For a list of all former and current Kapaz PFC players with a Wikipedia article, see Category:Kapaz PFC players.
Azerbaijani teams are limited to nine players without Azerbaijani citizenship. The squad list includes only the principal nationality of each player; several non-European players on the squad have dual citizenship with an EU country.

Current squad

Managers

Managers in Soviet League
  Isay Abramashvili
  Sabir Mammadov

Managers in modern history
 Şahmir Huseynov (1992)
 Mubariz Zeynalov (1993)
 Mehman Allahverdiyev (1993-2003)
 Fuad Ismayilov (2003-2004)
 Arzu Mirzayev (2003)
 Shahin Diniyev (2005–06)
 Fuad Ismayilov (2006)
 Mehman Allahverdiyev (2011)
 Mirbaghir Isayev (2011)
 Fuad Ismayilov (2011–2012)
 Mahmud Gurbanov (2012–2013)
 Vidadi Rzayev (2013–2015)
 Shahin Diniyev (2015–2017)
 Yunis Huseynov (2017–2018)
 Etibar Ibrahimov (2018–2019)
 Yashar Vahabzade (2019–2022)
 Tarlan Ahmadov (2022–present)

References

External links
 Official website

 
Football clubs in Azerbaijan
Sport in Ganja, Azerbaijan
Association football clubs established in 1959
1959 establishments in Azerbaijan
Soviet Top League clubs
Police association football clubs